Anab was a biblical city in the mountains of Judah.

Anab or ANAB may also refer to:

 ANAB (ANSI-ASQ National Accreditation Board), US-based non-governmental standards organization
 Anab, the NATO reporting name for the Kaliningrad K-8 air-to-air missile

See also 
 Annab (disambiguation)